Kilemarsky District (Kÿlemar kymdem; , Kilemar kundem) is an administrative and municipal district (raion), one of the fourteen in the Mari El Republic, Russia. It is located in the west of the republic. Its administrative center is the urban locality (an urban-type settlement) of Kilemary. As of the 2010 Census, the total population of the district was 13,604, with the population of Kilemary accounting for 29.9% of that number.

Administrative and municipal status
Within the framework of administrative divisions, Kilemarsky District is one of the fourteen in the republic. It is divided into one urban-type settlement (an administrative division with the administrative center in the urban-type settlement (inhabited locality) of Kilemary) and eight rural okrugs, all of which comprise seventy-seven rural localities. As a municipal division, the district is incorporated as Kilemarsky Municipal District. Kilemary Urban-Type Settlement is incorporated into an urban settlement, and the eight rural okrugs are incorporated into eight rural settlements within the municipal district. The urban-type settlement of Kilemary serves as the administrative center of both the administrative and municipal district.

References

Notes

Sources

Districts of Mari El
